Nocardiopsis xinjiangensis  is a halophilic bacterium from the genus of Nocardiopsis which has been isolated from saline soil in the Xinjiang Province in China.

References

External links
Type strain of Nocardiopsis xinjiangensis at BacDive -  the Bacterial Diversity Metadatabase

Further reading 
 
 
 

Actinomycetales
Bacteria described in 2003